Bona Sijabat (c. 1800 – 1862) was the long-serving chief of a Batak tribe of North Sumatra. He led the tribe into the Battle of Mount Simalungun in defence of their land from Dutch settlers, which resulted in many deaths, but liberated the area from Dutch land appropriation for several decades.

Early life
The exact place and date of Bona's birth are unknown, but his family are said to have always lived in Samosir. His father was an influential elder of a north Sumatran village at the time of King Singamangaraja, but was killed before Bona was born.

As a young tribe member,  Bona was renowned for his ability in a wide variety of pursuits including typically female-oriented tasks. As a result, he gained respect as a motivated, diverse individual across his Batak tribe.

Adulthood

When he was still young, the tribe's chief, Sidapitu, fell seriously ill – possibly with bowel cancer. Bona cared for the chief for many months, initially attempting to cure him, and thereafter trying to ensure that he was comfortable in the final days of his life.

Sidapitu had no sons, and as he was dying asked Bona to take his place as the head of the tribe. Although he was initially unwilling, other tribal elders asked him to reconsider, having observed the compassion and selflessness he had shown Sidapitu.

Tribal leader
Bona Sijabat became tribal chief in 1832. It was around this time that Dutch people began to enter deeper Sumatra. The locals, as well as nearby tribes, were forced from their homes and many were taken as slaves. Fierce conflict over the land resulted in much bloodshed, and a great number of slaves died from starvation and widespread disease.

Bona was conflicted by the unrest in Sumatra. Although naturally passive and peace-loving, he was intensely angered by the behaviour of the Dutch, and was active in rallying fighters and leaders from several tribes to reclaim their homes. In May 1840, he led his army into a great battle, later known as the Battle of Mount Simalungun. More than 1,000 people were killed in the battle, as well as large numbers of livestock. The Dutch burned tribal villages to the ground before returning to their settlements. They did not return until many decades later, after peaceful grazing had been established in some areas of Sumatra.

Following the war, Bona established groups of workers to rebuild the villages, and used his own medicinal skills to assist members of the tribes who had been injured in battle.

Bona went on to father nine daughters and one son. When he died of natural causes in 1862, his son took his place as the tribe's chief. To this day, some small villages hold an annual remembrance ceremony for Bona Sijabat and the significant role he played for his people.

References

1800 births
1862 deaths
People from North Sumatra
People of Batak descent